The quadrennial Canada Winter Games competition has an ice hockey tournament. The participants are the provincial and territorial ice hockey associations.

Participants
 Alberta (Hockey Alberta)
 British Columbia (BC Hockey)
 Manitoba (Hockey Manitoba)
 New Brunswick (Hockey New Brunswick)
 Newfoundland and Labrador (Hockey Newfoundland and Labrador)
 Northwest Territories (Hockey North)
 Nova Scotia (Hockey Nova Scotia)
 Nunavut (Hockey North)
 Ontario (Hockey Eastern Ontario, Hockey Northwestern Ontario, and Ontario Hockey Federation)
 Prince Edward Island (Hockey PEI)
 Quebec (Hockey Québec)
 Saskatchewan (Hockey Saskatchewan)
 Yukon (British Columbia Amateur Hockey Association)

Statistics

Participating provinces

Men

Women

Medal winners

Men

Women

Medal table

Men

Women

External links
Ice hockey at the Canada Games

Canada Games
Canada Games